The Jirnov is a left tributary of the river Dâmbovnic in Romania. It flows into the Dâmbovnic in Gratia.

References

Rivers of Romania
Rivers of Argeș County
Rivers of Dâmbovița County
Rivers of Teleorman County